Looking Up is an album by the Hugh Fraser  Quintet, which was released in 1988 by CBC Records. It won the 1989 Juno Award for  Best Jazz Album.

References 

1988 albums
Juno Award for Best Jazz Album albums